Islands Fine Burgers & Drinks (also known as Islands) is a casual dining restaurant chain that specializes in burgers, fresh cut fries, and specialty drinks.

Their tropical-themed restaurants are decorated to evoke the Hawaiian concept of "ohana" (family). Despite being known for their burgers and fries, various other types of food are also offered, such as tacos, chicken sandwiches, and multiple entree salads.

Corporate
The company is based in Carlsbad, California. It does not offer franchise opportunities.

History
The company was founded in May 1982 by entrepreneur Tony DeGrazier in West Los Angeles and currently has dozens of locations in California and two in Arizona

The Hawaiian-themed restaurant previously had an actual location in Hawaii that closed in 2020 after fifteen years in business.

See also

 List of hamburger restaurants

References 

Companies based in Carlsbad, California
Privately held companies based in California
Economy of the Southwestern United States
Regional restaurant chains in the United States
Restaurants established in 1962
Hamburger restaurants
Theme restaurants
1962 establishments in California